Kolur or Kolowr or Kolvar in Iran may refer to:
Kolowr, a city in Ardabil Province
Kolur, Ardabil, a village in Ardabil Province
Kolvar, Ardabil, a village in Ardabil Province
Kolur, Kermanshah, a village in Kermanshah Province

See also
Kalvar, Iran (disambiguation)